Anthony Cornelius Hamilton (born January 28, 1971) is an American musician, singer, songwriter, and record producer who rose to fame with his platinum-selling second studio album Comin' from Where I'm From (2003), which featured the title track single "Comin' from Where I'm From" and the follow-up "Charlene". Nominated for 17 Grammy Awards, he is also known for the song "Freedom" from the soundtrack album of Django Unchained co-written and sung as a duo with indie soul singer Elayna Boynton.

Career
Hamilton started singing in his church's choir at age 17. He attended South Mecklenburg High School where he sang in their award-winning choir under the direction of Mark Setzer. In 1992, he met producer Mark Sparks who encouraged Hamilton to leave Charlotte and head to New York City where he signed with Andre Harrell's Uptown Records. Hamilton co-wrote the 1999 hit "U Know What's Up" for singer Donell Jones. In 2000, he joined soul singer D'Angelo's international tour in promotion of the Voodoo album, on which he was a backup singer. On March 25, 2016, he released his sixth studio album What I'm Feelin' featuring guitarists Gary Clark, Jr. and Vince Gill with tracks produced by Mark Batson, Salaam Remi, and James Poyser.<ref>{{cite magazine|url=http://www.billboard.com/articles/columns/hip-hop/6889407/anthony-hamilton-what-im-feelin-exclusive|title=Anthony Hamilton Reveals Fifth Album 'What I'm Feelin: Exclusive|magazine=Billboard|access-date=2016-04-21}}</ref> After one week, the project ranked number two on the Billboard R&B chart, representing his highest career debut. Hamilton works with the background singers the HamilTones, often performing soul renditions of hip hop tracks.

Nappy Roots
Hamilton was first introduced to mainstream audiences with his singing of the chorus of Nappy Roots 2002 single "Po' Folks" which earned a Grammy Award nomination for "Best Rap/Sung Collaboration" in 2003. "Po' Folks" is the second single from the multi-platinum Watermelon, Chicken & Gritz album. Hamilton followed up with three collaborations on Nappy Roots next Atlantic Records release Wooden Leather with "Sick & Tired", "Push On", "Organic" and then one feature on The Humdinger on the single "Down N' Out". Nappy Roots and Hamilton have a song together called "Bluegrass Stain'd" with Mark Ronson that was released through Elektra Records.

2004–present
Hamilton was featured on Jadakiss' 2004 hit "Why" (which was nominated for the "Best Rap/Song Collaboration" Grammy in 2005) and two of 2Pac's remixed songs. Hamilton contributed to 2002's "Thugz Mansion" (7" remix) and 2006's "Dear Mama" (Frank Nitty Remix). Hamilton's first compilation album, Soulife, was composed of songs recorded during the early part of his career. These previous works were released in June 2005. Ain't Nobody Worryin, his gold-selling third studio album, was released on December 13, 2005.

Hamilton was featured on a track from The RH Factor's 2003 album Hard Groove called "Kwah/Home". He appeared on Angie Stone's "Stay For A While" in 2004. He made a guest appearance on blues singer-guitarist Buddy Guy's 2005 album Bring 'Em In, contributing vocals to a cover version of Bob Dylan's 1969 "Lay Lady Lay," which featured Robert Randolph.

At the 2006 BET Awards, Hamilton won the BET J "Cool Like That" Award. Comedian Dave Chappelle had Hamilton as a musical guest on his show Chappelle's Show in episode 6, Season 2 that premiered on Comedy Central. He made a guest appearance on the UPN show All of Us in Season 2. Hamilton made a cameo as a soul singer in the film American Gangster, to whose soundtrack he contributed. During the 2008 BET Awards, Hamilton performed Al Green's "Tired of Being Alone" during a tribute to Green's career. Later in 2008, he was featured on The Recession the certified Gold selling album by Young Jeezy.

In July 2011, Jill Scott released her hit single "So In Love" featuring Hamilton. The track spent 19 weeks at the number one spot on the Urban AC charts.

2012 found Hamilton on two successful Def Jam releases: Big K.R.I.T.'s Live from the Underground and Life Is Good by Nas, which debuted at #1 on Billboard 200. Later on in 2012 Hamilton was featured on the soundtrack to Quentin Tarantino's Django Unchained in the track "Freedom" in a duo with indie soul singer Elayna Boynton. British DJ Ben Pearce sampled vocals from Hamilton's song, "Cornbread, Fish & Collard Greens" in his 2013 song, "What I Might Do". In 2015, Hamilton made a guest appearance on the song "That One", the first single from Teedra Moses' second album Cognac & Conversation.

Further demonstrating his diversity, Hamilton made a cameo appearance on the hit Fox show, EMPIRE, where he performed "Point of It All"' as part of main character Luscious Lyon's proposal to his girlfriend. The episode aired February 4, 2015.

On February 24, 2016, Hamilton performed at the last "In Performance at the White House" hosted by President Barack Obama and First Lady Michelle as part of a tribute to iconic singer Ray Charles. On March 25, he released his 6th studio album "What I'm Feelin", which he describes as an "emotional" cleanse reflecting on some of the hurdles he has faced. Hamilton partnered with Cracker Barrel Old Country Store to release a deluxe version of the album sold online and in stores across the country. On March 28, 2016, Hamilton performed on NPR's critically acclaimed Tiny Desk Concerts where he performed his new single "Amen," "Best of Me," "Cool," and "Charlene." Chris Brown recruited Hamilton to perform on the "Legends" remix to his hit single "Back to Sleep," which was released on April 10, 2016. On April 21st, Hamilton embarked on a nationwide tour with Fantasia.

Hamilton was featured on the track "Carnival" from virtual band Gorillaz' 2017 album Humanz.

On May 15, 2020, Hamilton released his single "Back Together" featuring the late Rick James via his new imprint My Music Box, in partnership with BMG. The song was co-written by Hamilton and Ed D. Kane, and produced by 9th Wonder. It is the first single off his new album that will release on September 24, 2021.

Personal life
Hamilton has six sons.

Dating since 2003, he married his background singer Tarsha McMillan in 2005.  On November 2, 2010, Hamilton and his wife Tarsha welcomed twin boys. On his official Facebook page on June 11, 2012, Hamilton announced the birth of another son. The couple announced on June 20, 2015, after 10 years of marriage, that they were getting a divorce.

Discography

Studio albums
 XTC (1996)
 Comin' from Where I'm From (2003)
 Ain't Nobody Worryin' (2005)
 The Point of It All (2008)
 Back to Love (2011)
 Home for the Holidays (2014)
 What I'm Feelin' (2016)
 Love Is the New Black (2021)

Awards and nominations
BET Awards

|-
| rowspan="2"|2004
| rowspan="3"|Anthony Hamilton
|Best New Artist
|
|-
| rowspan="2"|Best Male R&B Artist
|
|-
| rowspan="2"|2005
|
|-
|"Why" (with Jadakiss)
|Best Collaboration
|
|-
| rowspan="2"|2006
| rowspan="2"|Anthony Hamilton
|BET J Cool Like Dat Award
|
|-
|Best Male R&B Artist
|
|}

Critic's Choice Movie Awards

|-
|2007
|"Do You Feel Me"
|Best Song
|
|}

Grammy Awards

|-
| rowspan="3"|2004
|"Comin' from Where I'm From"
|Best Traditional R&B Performance
|
|-
|"Comin' from Where I'm From"
|Best R&B Song
|
|-
|"Comin' from Where I'm From"
|Best Contemporary R&B Album
|
|-
|2005
|"Charlene"
|Best Male R&B Vocal Performance
|
|-
|2009
|"You've Got The Love I Need" (with Al Green)
|Best Traditional R&B Performance
|
|-
| rowspan="3"|2010
|"Soul Music"
|Best Traditional R&B Performance
|
|-
|"The Point Of It All"
|Best Male R&B Vocal Performance
|
|-
|"The Point Of It All"
|Best R&B Album
|
|-
| rowspan="2"|2013
|"Back To Love"
|Best R&B Album
|
|-
|"Pray For Me"
|Best R&B Song
|
|-
||2014
|"Best of Me"
|Best R&B Song
|
|-
||2017
|"What I'm Feelin' (featuring The HamilTones)"
|Best Traditional R&B Performance
|
|}

NAACP Image Awards

|-
|2004
|Anthony Hamilton
|Outstanding New Artist
|
|-
| rowspan="2"|2005
|Anthony Hamilton
|Outstanding Male Artist
|
|-
| "Charlene"
|Outstanding Song
|
|}
2022 
MOBO Awards

|-
| 2006
| Himself
| Best Reggae
|
|}

Soul Train Music Awards

|-
| rowspan="2"| 2004
| "Comin' From Where I'm From"
| Favorite Male R&B/Soul Single
|
|-
| Comin' From Where I'm From''
| Favorite Male R&B/Soul Album
|
|-
| 2005
| "Charlene"
| Favorite Male R&B/Soul Single
|
|-
| 2006
| Soulife
| Favorite Male R&B/Soul Album
|
|}

References

External links
 
 
 
 Watch Verzuz TV Live Stream Free

1971 births
20th-century American singers
21st-century American singers
African-American male singers
American contemporary R&B singers
African-American songwriters
Arista Records artists
Grammy Award winners
Jive Records artists
Living people
MCA Records artists
Musicians from Charlotte, North Carolina
American neo soul singers
RCA Records artists
Singers from North Carolina
So So Def Recordings artists
Songwriters from North Carolina
Zomba Group of Companies artists
Ballad musicians
20th-century American male singers
21st-century American male singers
The Soultronics members